Bilara railway station is a railway station in Jodhpur district, Rajasthan. Its code is BARA. It serves Bilara city. The station consists of 2 platforms. Passenger trains start from here.

Trains

The following trains start from Bilara railway station:

 Bilara–Jodhpur Passenger

References

Railway stations in Jodhpur district
Jodhpur railway division